Chalk streams are rivers that rise from springs in landscapes with chalk bedrock. Since chalk is permeable, water percolates easily through the ground to the water table and chalk streams therefore receive little surface runoff. As a result, the water in the streams contains little organic matter and sediment and is generally very clear. The beds of the rivers are generally composed of clean, compacted gravel and flints, which are good spawning areas for Salmonidae fish species.

Since they are fed primarily by aquifers, the flow rate, mineral content and temperature range of chalk streams exhibit less seasonal variation than other rivers. They are mildly alkaline and contain high levels of nitrate, phosphate, potassium and silicate. In addition to algae and diatoms, the streams provide a suitable habitat for macrophytes (including water crowfoot) and oxygen levels are generally supportive of coarse fish populations.

Of the 210 rivers classified as chalk streams globally, 160 are in England.

Geology and hydrology
Chalk is a highly porous and permeable rock, and rain falling onto chalk topography percolates directly into the ground, where the chalk layer acts as an aquifer. The groundwater flows through the chalk bedrock, re-emerging lower down the slope in springs. The chalk acts as a temporary reservoir by regulating the amount of water supplied to the springs. This is why many chalk streams in the UK have stable flow regimes that vary only slightly over time. On cold winter mornings, water vapour from the relatively warm stream condenses in the cold air above to form fog.

Chalk is slightly soluble in rainwater because rain is naturally slightly acidic. The products of chalk weathering are dissolved in rainwater and are transported in stream flow. Chalk streams transport little suspended material (unlike most rivers), but are considered "mineral-rich" due to the dissolved calcium and carbonate ions. The surface water of chalk streams is commonly described as "gin clear". The channel bed consists of angular flint gravel derived from the natural flint deposits found embedded within the chalk geology that contains relatively low amounts of clay and silt deposits.

The unique characteristics of chalk stream ecology are due to stable temperature and flow regimes combined with highly transparent water and lack of sand grade sediment particles.

Ecology
The chalk streams have been intensively managed for many generations. In the 20th and 21st centuries, much of that management has been aimed at producing the best conditions for fly fishing, and most specifically, dry fly fishing. The chalk streams hold a good number of wild salmonid fish species such as the brown trout (Salmo trutta), Atlantic salmon (Salmo salar) and grayling (Thymallus thymallus). In addition to these there are also considerable numbers of stocked brown trout and stocked rainbow trout (Oncorhynchus mykiss). The rich invertebrate life and characteristic transparent shallow water make chalk rivers and streams particularly suited to fly fishing.

Many of the chalk stream springs are also used as sites for watercress production, due to the constant temperature and clean, alkaline, mineral-rich spring water. The Mid Hants Watercress Railway in Hampshire is so named on account of its use for transporting watercress to London from local chalk streams. A number of the chalk aquifers and associated groundwater sources related to chalk streams and rivers are used for water abstraction by local and national water utility companies.

Chalk streams of England
Although chalk streams are generally watercourses originating from chalk hills, including winterbournes, streams, and rivers, the term chalk stream is used even for larger rivers, which would normally be considered too large for the term stream. The Somme in northern France is a chalk stream on a larger scale.

Chalk streams of the Southern England Chalk Formation in Berkshire, Hampshire, Wiltshire, Dorset and the Isle of Wight:
River Avon and its tributaries including the 
River Bourne
River Ebble
River Nadder
River Wylye
River Frome
River Itchen and its small tributaries
River Kennet 
River Lambourn
River Loddon
Letcombe Brook
River Meon
River Piddle
River Test and its tributaries
River Caul Bourne

Chalk streams of the Southern England Chalk Formation in the Chiltern Hills, Hertfordshire and Surrey (tributaries of the River Thames, River Lea and River Colne):
River Ash
Barton Springs
River Beane
River Bulbourne
River Chess
River Gade
River Granta Cambridgeshire
Hambleden Brook
Hogsmill River
Hughenden Stream
River Lea
River Mimram
River Misbourne
River Pang
River Quin
River Rib
River Stort
River Ver

Chalk streams of the Yorkshire Wolds:
Driffield Beck, which is a tributary of the River Hull
Gypsey Race, the most northerly chalk stream in Europe, runs east to the sea at Bridlington
Settrington Beck, which is a tributary of the River Derwent

Chalk streams of Lincolnshire:
There are several chalk streams in the Lincolnshire Wolds including

Great Eau 
River Waring 
River Bain 
River Lymn 
River Lud, 
Laceby Beck,
Nettleton Beck,
Waithe Beck,

Chalk streams of Kent:
River Dour
Nailbourne
River Darent
(there are more in Kent than listed here)

Chalk streams of Norfolk:
Babingley
Bure
Burn
Gaywood
Glaven
Heacham
Hun
Ingol
Mun
Nar
Stiffkey
Tas
Waveney
Wensum
Wissey
Yare
Weybourne Beck

Chalk streams of Suffolk:
River Lark
River Linnet

See also
 Chalk Formation

References

External links
Wildlife Trusts - chalk streams
WWF - England's Chalk Streams under threat Includes an index of all chalk streams in England in linked report
FishPal - about chalk streams Includes a small list of chalk streams and their locations

Water streams